Lourembam is a Meetei Manipuri surname or family name which has Indian origin.  

People of this family mainly inhabit in Manipur, India.

See Also

References 

Meitei surnames
Pages with unreviewed translations